Finn Braden O'Connor (born 14 February 1971 in Christchurch) is a New Zealand sprint canoeist who competed in the early 1990s. He was eliminated in the semifinals of the K-4 1000 m event at the 1992 Summer Olympics in Barcelona.

External links
 

1971 births
Canoeists at the 1992 Summer Olympics
Living people
New Zealand male canoeists
Olympic canoeists of New Zealand
Sportspeople from Christchurch
20th-century New Zealand people